FusionReactor is a developer and DevOps focused Java application performance monitor (APM) solution, developed by Intergral GmbH for monitoring Java application servers such as Tomcat, WildFly. WebSphere, GlassFish and in particular Adobe ColdFusion and Lucee. FusionReactor provides all the low level metrics, telemetry and insight developers need from a monitoring solution. Since its initial release in November 2005, FusionReactor has been used by thousands of organizations to successfully monitor their production environments.

As an observability platform and APM FusionReactor offers Metrics, Automatic Error Detection, JDBC|Database monitoring, Memory/Code/Thread Tracing and Log Monitoring and is used by software developers and DevOps to pinpoint application errors and application performance bottlenecks and to find exceptions in software code. The software also has a production-grade debugging tool and automated route cause analysis. FusionReactor is used to monitor monolith applications and distributed environments such as Docker and Kubernetes.

FusionReactor is available with on-premise and hybrid cloud (SaaS) licensing.

References 

Software performance management
CFML programming language
Cloud applications